According to the Book of Mormon, Aminadab was a Nephite who fell away from the church, and became associated with the Lamanites.

In the Book of Helaman, after Nephi abdicated the Chief Judgment Seat to Cezoram, he and his brother Lehi went to preach to the Lamanites, who imprison them.

Lamanite prisons
One day, angels came and wrapped Nephi and Lehi in fire, while darkness surrounded the people. The guards were confused, and Aminadab told them to repent. The text implies the guard prayed in faith, had his body encircled with fire, and converted. Aminadab's testimony helped to convert three hundred Lamanites who witnessed the events.

Etymology

Alternatively, the first two syllables could relate to Ammon (or Amon), which according to LDS apologist Hugh Nibley, is "the commonest name in the Book of Mormon" and "the commonest name in the Egyptian Empire" (which embraced Palestine at Lehi's time, which fell within its Late Period). The name also occurs in the Bible.

See also
 Book of Helaman
 Various Book of Mormon people

References

External links
 Helaman 5.

Book of Mormon people
Angelic visionaries